TatNeft Arena (ru: Татнефть-Арена) is an indoor sporting arena located in Kazan, Russia.  The capacity of the arena is 10,000 and was opened in 2005. The arena is home to Ak Bars Kazan of the Kontinental Hockey League.

Tatneft Cup
Every year since the 2008 kickboxing tournament called Tatneft Cup is held in the arena. Tournament consists of three tournaments in three weight categories (-70 kg, -80 kg, +80 kg) with 4 selections of 1/8 finals, 2 selections of quarter-finals, semi-finals and final tournament. The tournament is according to the K-1 rules, in 3x3 format with the exception of the fight going to an automatic 4th extension round if there is no knockdown during the first three rounds.

Tatneft Cup Champions:

See also
 List of indoor arenas in Russia

References

External links

 

Indoor ice hockey venues in Russia
Indoor arenas in Russia
Music venues in Russia
Sport in Kazan
Buildings and structures in Kazan
Ak Bars Kazan
Kontinental Hockey League venues